André Goustat was a French politician who was the co-founder of CPNT, an agrarianist political party in France. Goustat also served as the mayor of Mauzac-et-Grand-Castang and as the regional councilor of Aquitaine from 1992 to 2004.

Biography 
Goustat was born on May 18, 1935 in Mauzac-et-Grand-Castang, Nouvelle-Aquitaine, France. In 1989, he helped found the CPNT political party in France, acting as the chairman for nine years before being charged in 1998 for embezzlement. He led the CPNT in the 1989 and 1994 European Parliament elections in France. After being charged for embezzlement, he handed the role of chairman over to Jean Saint-Josse. Goustat died on July 27, 2016.

References 

1935 births
2016 deaths